Louis Russell Bell (born May 27, 1982) is an American record producer, vocal producer, songwriter, and mixing engineer. Bell's work includes production for Post Malone, Camila Cabello, Halsey, Justin Bieber, Miley Cyrus, 5 Seconds of Summer, Taylor Swift, Juice Wrld, DJ Khaled, Kanye West and Frank Dukes among others. A producer and writer specializing in various genres, Bell has 18 US top 10 hits to his credit, including eight number ones, all since 2018. Billboard called Bell's impact on the top of the charts "historic" and labeled him "pop's most prolific, accomplished and untethered freelancer of 2019".

Life and career

Early life
Louis Bell was born on May 27, 1982, in Quincy, Massachusetts. He began taking piano lessons at the age of 11 and used this skill to make beats with a keyboard and the audio software Fruity Loops, which led to him developing himself as a rapper and recording himself on the computer and eventually opening his own studio in Boston where he worked with dozens of artists.

Career
In 2013, Bell moved to Los Angeles after signing with his manager Austin Rosen, CEO/Founder of Electric Feel Management. After some time working together in the studio, Bell and artist Post Malone quickly realized they had a great chemistry, and the same vision musically. The duo continued to work together on Post Malone's debut album Stoney and multiple singles including "Congratulations" that gained popularity in late 2015.

Bell's career took off in January 2016 when Justin Bieber visited him, Malone, and fellow producer Frank Dukes in the studio while finishing the Stoney album and the resulting product was the hit song "Deja Vu".

In August 2016, Bell's first hit song, "Let Me Love You" by Justin Bieber, DJ Snake, and co-written with a longtime collaborator Andrew Watt, made its chart-topping debut. Bell co-wrote and vocal produced the Frank Dukes & Metro Boomin co-production "Congratulations", Stoney's lead single, which debuted at Top 10 on the Billboard Hot 100 Chart followed by "Rockstar", the lead single of Malone's second album, Beerbongs & Bentleys, which held the No. 1 spot on Billboard's Hot 100 chart for eight straight weeks.

Bell has also collaborated with numerous artists including PartyNextDoor, Tyga, Juvenile, Sugar Ray, Mike Stud, OMI, Joe Budden, Andrew Watt, and many more. Bell earned a spot on Variety's 2017 Hitmakers list for his work on Malone's "Congratulations", Kygo's collaboration with Selena Gomez's "It Ain't Me", and Camila Cabello's and Young Thug's "Havana".

On July 6, 2019, Bell became only the second person to top Billboard's newly launched Hot 100 Producer chart. This was thanks to four Hot 100 charting titles, on which Bell is credited as a producer. He also reached number 3 on the Hot 100 Songwriters chart, thanks to his five songwriting credits on the Hot 100.

Bell signed an exclusive publishing deal with Universal Music Publishing Group in January 2021.

Production and songwriting credits

Accolades

Grammy Awards 

Grammy Award Winner Certificate-eligible nominations, as opposed to statuette-eligible.

iHeartRadio Music Awards

References

External links
 

Living people
1982 births
Record producers from Massachusetts
People from Boston
Songwriters from Massachusetts
People from Quincy, Massachusetts